Porter Cottrell (born 1962, Louisville, Kentucky) is an IFBB American professional bodybuilder.

Contest history
1988 Junior Nationals - NPC, Overall Winner 
1988 Junior Nationals - NPC, Light-HeavyWeight, 1st 
1989 Nationals - NPC, Light-HeavyWeight, 3rd 
1991 Nationals - NPC, Light-HeavyWeight, 1st 
1992 Chicago Pro Invitational - IFBB, 1st 
1992 Grand Prix England - IFBB, 5th 
1992 Grand Prix Germany - IFBB, 4th 
1992 Grand Prix Holland - IFBB, 7th 
1992 Grand Prix Italy - IFBB, 5th 
1992 Niagara Falls Pro Invitational - IFBB, 1st 
1992 Night of Champions - IFBB, 2nd 
1992 Olympia - IFBB, 8th 
1993 Chicago Pro Invitational - IFBB, 1st 
1993 Night of Champions - IFBB, 1st 
1993 Pittsburgh Pro Invitational - IFBB, 1st 
1994 Arnold Classic - IFBB, 3rd 
1994 Grand Prix England - IFBB, 9th 
1994 Grand Prix Germany - IFBB, 7th 
1994 Grand Prix Spain - IFBB, 5th 
1994 Olympia - IFBB, 5th 
1994 San Jose Pro Invitational - IFBB, 2nd 
1996 Arnold Classic - IFBB, 8th 
1996 San Jose Pro Invitational - IFBB, 10th 
1998 Night of Champions - IFBB, 6th 
1998 San Francisco Pro Invitational - IFBB, 6th 
1998 Toronto Pro Invitational - IFBB, 4th 
1999 Night of Champions - IFBB, 9th 
1999 Toronto Pro Invitational - IFBB, 3rd

External links 
 Porter Cottrell Homepage
 Bodybuilder Porter Cottrell
 Porter Cottrell - Interview with Famous Bodybuilder Porter Cottrell
 MuscleMemory entry

American bodybuilders
1962 births
Living people
Professional bodybuilders